Humburky is a municipality and village in Hradec Králové District in the Hradec Králové Region of the Czech Republic. It has about 400 inhabitants.

Geography
It lies in a flat agricultural landscape of the East Elbe Table. It is situated on the left bank of the Cidlina River.

References

External links

Villages in Hradec Králové District